Provincial Road 215 (PR 215) is a short provincial road in the Canadian province of Manitoba.

It passes through the town as Park Avenue and ends at the town's east end at a junction with PTH 44 and PR 302.

PR 215 runs exactly parallel to the PTH 12/PTH 44 multiplex  to the north and serves as a business route through Beausejour for both highways. It was first listed on Manitoba's official highway map in 1966.

References

External links
Official Manitoba Highway Map

215